Slot Machine (สล็อท แมชชีน) is a Thai rock band from Bangkok. Their song "Phan" ("Yesterday") was awarded Song of the Year at the Seed Awards held in January 2007, "Phan" was awarded again at the 2nd Seed Awards and nominated for Rock Album of the Year, Rock Artist of the Year and Music Video of the Year. They also were awarded Band of The Year at the Nine Entertainment Awards. The band is currently signed to Tero Music (also known as Sony Music Thailand) and previously released a number of albums for Sony Music.

Members 
 Karinyawat Durongjirakan (Foet)  – vocals (2000 – present)
 Atirath Pintong (Gak) – bass guitar (2000 — present)
 Janevit Chanpanyawong (Vit)  — guitar (2006 – present)

Former members
 Supon Sillapasas (Games) – guitar (2000 — 2004)
 Kanun Weeranarong (Kon) — guitar  (2000 — 2005)
 Porama Oupasarn (Ker) — drums (2000 — 2005)
 Kemsopon Wongpaisarnsin (Yut) – guitar (2006 — 2008)
 Settharat Pancgchunan (Auto)  — drums (2006 – 2018)

Discography

Studio albums
The Third Eye View
Spin the World (2016, Tero Music)
Rainbow (2014, Tero Music)
Time Machine (2004-2013) The Best of Slot Machine ( 2013, Tero Music)
 CELL (2011, Sony Music)
 GREY (2008, Sony Music)
 Mutation (2006, Sony Music)

English singles
"Phiang Waichai" (2022)
"Free Fall" (2022)
"Bangkok" (2020)
"Hummingbird" (2019)
 "Know Your Enemy" (2018)
 "Sweet Bird" (2017)
 "Spin the World" (2017)
 "And We Go" (2017)
 "Sky Burning Stars" (2017)
 "Say What You Want" (2016)
 "I Know, I Know" (2016)
 "Give It All to You" (2015)

Concerts 
 Concert "Khuen Klai Punn" – December 24, 2006 at EVI Place Soi Sukhumvit 63 (Ekkamai)
 Slot Machine: The first contact - September 27, 2013 at Impact Arena MuangThongThani
 Slot Machine: The Mothership Concert - August 26, 2017

Awards and nominations

References

External links
 Official website

Thai rock music groups
Musical groups from Bangkok